Petar Aranitović (Cyrillic: Петар Аранитовић; born September 20, 1994) is a Serbian professional basketball player for Batumi of the Georgian Superliga.

Professional career

Partizan
Aranitović debuted in the Euroleague on 5 December 2013, against Budivelnyk and scored 2 points for almost a minute on court. In Partizan did not immediately get a chance in the first team, but he successfully played for the junior team of Partizan. In his first season as a professional player, he won the Basketball League of Serbia with Partizan defeating Crvena zvezda with 3-1 in the final series. The first serious chance in the senior team got to the final tournament of the Radivoj Korać Cup on 7 February 2014. In the defeat of his team of FMP, Petar Aranitović has provided an excellent game where he scored 20 points and was the most efficient player of Partizan in that game. Yet after that , he was not given a real chance. The following season he was regular member of the first team but the coach Duško Vujošević put into play only in the first round against Szolnoki Olaj when he has scored 2 points.

Yet early next 2015/16. season gets significantly more space in the game. During the preparatory period had a remarkable effect, and already in the first match against Igokea where he got more space scored 24 points with 5 affected triplets. On 13 September 2015, Aranitović has scored 26 points against FMP on the preparation match in 94-86 win for Partizan.

Manresa
On July 23, 2016, Aranitović signed a three-year contract with Spanish club ICL Manresa.

Personal
Petar has a younger brother Aleksandar Aranitović who is also a basketball player.

References

External links
 Petar Aranitović at aba-liga.com
 Petar Aranitović at fiba.com
 Profile at realgm.com
 Profile at eurobasket.com

1994 births
Living people
ABA League players
Basketball League of Serbia players
Basketball players from Belgrade
Bàsquet Manresa players
KK Crvena zvezda youth players
KK Partizan players
KK Lovćen players
Liga ACB players
Palencia Baloncesto players
Point guards
Serbian men's basketball players
Serbian expatriate basketball people in Georgia (country)
Serbian expatriate basketball people in Montenegro
Serbian expatriate basketball people in Spain
Shooting guards